Akkol is a lake in the Talas District, Zhambyl Region, southern Kazakhstan.

It is located close to the southwest of Akkol village. In the summer the lakeshores are a vacation spot.

Geography
Lake Akkol freezes from late December to late March.

History
There are two ways to translate the toponym: most often its meaning is "White lake" in the Kazakh language.

Fauna
The main fish species in the lake are bream, zander, carp, crucian carp and roach.

References

External links
Maryashev Monuments of Semirechye archeology and their use in excursions-Almaty, 2002

Jambyl Region
Akkol